İkinci Biləcik (also, Biledzhik, Biledzhik Vtoroy, Biledzhik Vtoroye, and Bilyadzhik) is a village and municipality in the Shaki Rayon of Azerbaijan.  It has a population of 1,141.

References 

Populated places in Shaki District